Damaneh (also Romanized as Dāmaneh; also known as Dam Nī, Damneh, and Dunbeni) is a city in Central District, Faridan County, Isfahan Province, Iran. At the 2006 census, its population was 4,513, in 1,156 families.

Gallery

References

Populated places in Faridan County

Cities in Isfahan Province